P.S. Zindagi (Post Seismic Life) is Nepal's first online sitcom. It shows the unfolding of comedy and drama in the lives of five Nepali youth from diverse backgrounds, following the April 2015 Nepal earthquake. It was a creative experiment where a small team used their own individual resources and passion to create a fun and self-empowering narrative of the lives of the urban youth.

Cast
 Rajkumar Pudasaini as Krishna
 Sujata Koirala as Kokab Akhtar
 Kavita Srinivasan as Juna Akhtar
 Utpal Jha as 	JP
 Kalsang D. Lama as Dolma
 Menuka Pradhan (Cameo)

Awards

P.S. Zindagi has won the Outstanding Excellence award for Direction and Ensemble Cast in the WRPN.TV Global Webisode Competition (WGWC), in Summer 2016. This is UK-based global competition for webisodes and TV series from 41 countries. This competition aims to promote and present a worldwide community of Webisodes/TV series.

P.S. Zindagi has also been officially selected to compete in the Marseille Web Fest (October 2016), the DMOFF Festival (August 2016) and the Indiewise Festival (September 2016).

References

External links
 P.S. Zindagi
 Musumusu on Youtube
 Musumus.tv

2016 web series debuts
Nepalese web series